Thomas Régnier (born 11 March 1984) is a French professional footballer who plays as a striker for Championnat National 2 club Belfort.

Career
Régnier played on the professional level in Ligue 1 for Sochaux and in Ligue 2 for Clermont. He played 2 games for Sochaux in the 2004–05 UEFA Cup.

References

1984 births
Living people
Sportspeople from Belfort
French footballers
Association football forwards
Ligue 1 players
Ligue 2 players
Championnat National players
Championnat National 2 players
FC Sochaux-Montbéliard players
Clermont Foot players
SO Châtellerault players
AS Cannes players
FC Mulhouse players
Stade de Reims players
SR Colmar players
ASM Belfort players
Footballers from Bourgogne-Franche-Comté